Bloomsburg, also known as the Watkins House, is a historic plantation estate located at 9000 Philpott Road (United States Route 58) southwest of South Boston, Halifax County, Virginia.  The main house was completed about 1839, after seven years of construction, by Alexander Watkins, a local farmer and businessman.  It is a two-story brick structure, with a Greek temple portico that appears to be a 20th-century addition, but is by lore similar to an original one.  The house is one of Halifax County's early Greek Revival plantation houses.

The property was listed on the National Register of Historic Places in 2017.

See also
National Register of Historic Places listings in Halifax County, Virginia

References

Historic districts in Virginia
Houses on the National Register of Historic Places in Virginia
Greek Revival architecture in Virginia
Houses completed in 1839
Houses in Halifax County, Virginia
National Register of Historic Places in Halifax County, Virginia